Carl Henrik Bøgh (3 September 1827, in Copenhagen – 19 October 1893, in Copenhagen) was a Danish painter; best known for his scenes with animals.

Biography
His father, Hans Henrik Bøgh, was a school teacher. His older brother, Erik Bøgh, became a journalist and playwright. In 1863, he married Cathrine Sophie Henriette Møller, the daughter of a District Bailiff, the equivalent of a local judge. Their daughter, Elisabeth (1865-1948), also became a painter.

After serving as a soldier in the First Schleswig War, he attended the Royal Danish Academy of Fine Arts, where he studied with Johan Ludwig Lund, and decided to specialize in animal painting. He first had a showing in 1854, in the Spring Exhibition at Charlottenborg Palace.

From 1860 to 1861, he made a study trip abroad, with the travel scholarship from Academy; visiting Brussels and Antwerp, but spending most of his time in Paris. In 1870 and 1875, some of his works were purchased by the "Royal Painting Collection" (now the National Gallery of Denmark). In 1873, he became a Professor.

His paintings of deer were among his most popular. He also made painting expeditions to Norway and Sweden.

Sources
 Bögh, Carl Henrik, In: Ulrich Thieme, Felix Becker (Eds.): Allgemeines Lexikon der Bildenden Künstler von der Antike bis zur Gegenwart, Vol. 4: Bida–Brevoort. Wilhelm Engelmann, Leipzig 1910, pg.189 
  Bøgh, Carl Henrik In: Carl Frederik Bricka (Ed.): Dansk biografisk Lexikon, Vol.3: Brandt–Clavus, 1889, pgs.311–312, @ Projekt Runeberg  
 Karl Henrik Bögh, In: Bernhard Meijer (Ed.): Nordisk familjebok konversationslexikon och realencyklopedi, Vol.4 Brant–Cesti, 1905 pg.870, @ Projekt Runeberg

External links 

 Biographical data @ the Kunstindeks Danmark
 More works by Bøgh @ ArtNet

1827 births
1893 deaths
Danish painters
Animal painters
Royal Danish Academy of Fine Arts alumni
Artists from Copenhagen